Čajčycy (Čajčycy) is a village in Belarus.

It is part of the Rachavičy selsoviet, Sluck District, Minsk Region.

In the 19th century Čajčycy was a zaścianek. Today, the village barely has permanent residents and hosts several dachas of residents of nearby town of Sluck.

References

Villages in Belarus
Slutsk District